Jean Galia (born 20 March 1905 in Ille-sur-Têt, Pyrénées-Orientales, died 17 January 1949 in Toulouse) was a French rugby union and rugby league footballer and champion boxer. He is credited with establishing the sport of rugby league in France in 1934, where it is known as rugby à treize ("rugby 13s").

Playing in the forwards, Galia made his international debut for the France national rugby union team in a 1927 test against England in Paris. After 20 internationals, He later played in France's first ever rugby league international, also against England in Paris, on 15 April 1934 and was captain of the France national rugby league team in its early days. Following France's tour of Northern England, Galia arranged a series of demonstration matches around France.

The Courtney Goodwill Trophy, international rugby league's first, was presented for the first time in 1936 and depicted Galia, along with other pioneering greats of the code, James Lomas (Britain), Albert Baskiville (New Zealand) and Dally Messenger (Australia).

In 1988 Galia was inducted into the Rugby League Hall of Fame.

References

External links
Jean Galia at scrum.com
 Jean Galia's introduction of the May 1934 Yorkshire's tour in France : Jean Galia's parent of the expression jeu à treize or Game of thirteen
History of rugby league at napit.co.uk
History of Rugby football in France at independent.co.uk

1905 births
1949 deaths
Dual-code rugby internationals
France international rugby union players
France national rugby league team captains
France national rugby league team coaches
France national rugby league team players
French male boxers
French rugby league coaches
French rugby league players
French rugby union players
Rugby league second-rows
Sportspeople from Pyrénées-Orientales
Toulouse Olympique coaches
Villeneuve Leopards players